Olli Penttala (born 10 April 1995) is a Finnish freestyle skier. He competed in the 2022 Winter Olympics.

Career
Penttala began skiing at the age of seven. He won a bronze medal at the 2011 Junior World Championships in the moguls event. He placed eighth in moguls in the 2021 World Championships. He finished 9th out of 30 competitors in the first qualifying round in the men's moguls event at the 2022 Winter Olympics. He then finished 19th out of 20 competitors in the first final round, eliminating him from medal contention.

Personal life
Penttala's older brother Jussi is also a freestyle skier and competed at the 2014 and 2018 Winter Olympics.

References

1995 births
Living people
Freestyle skiers at the 2022 Winter Olympics
Finnish male freestyle skiers
Olympic freestyle skiers of Finland
Sportspeople from Helsinki
21st-century Finnish people